Bernard Marie François Alexandre Collomb-Clerc (7 October 1930 in Annecy, Haute-Savoie – 19 September 2011 in La Colle-sur-Loup, Alpes-Maritimes) was a Formula One driver from France.  He participated in six World Championship Grands Prix, debuting on 2 July 1961, scoring no championship points.  He almost always drove self-prepared cars, and first raced Coopers, switching to Lotuses in 1963.  His best Formula One result was fourth at Vienna in a non-Championship race in 1961, at the wheel of a Cooper-Climax.

Complete Formula One World Championship results
(key)

Non-Championship results
(key)

References

"The Grand Prix Who's Who", Steve Small, 1996

1930 births
2011 deaths
Sportspeople from Annecy
French racing drivers
French Formula One drivers
24 Hours of Le Mans drivers
World Sportscar Championship drivers

12 Hours of Reims drivers